Charaxes kirki is a butterfly in the family Nymphalidae. It is found in Kenya, Tanzania and Uganda.

Description
f. kirki Btlr. Hindwing above with broad white median band, with the proximal border bluish and the distal somewhat yellowish, marginal streaks olive, in cellules 4-6 orange. The two rows of spots on the forewing are joined together in cellules la-3 and only in cellules 4-7 more or less completely separated; the band formed by them is yellowish white to ochre-yellow. German and British East Africa.

Biology
The habitat consists of savanna and dry forests.

The larvae feed on Acacia mellifera, Albizia adianthifolia, Albizia coriaria, Albizia schimperiana, Entada abyssinica, Entada leptostachys, Entada africana, Entada phaseoloides, Tamarindus indica, Acacia caffra, Albizia sassa, Albizia gummifera and Entada gigas.

Notes on the biology of kirki are provided by Kielland (1990) and Larsen (1991)

Taxonomy
Charaxes kirki is a member of the Charaxes etheocles species group.

Subspecies
Charaxes kirki kirki (central and eastern Kenya, central, northern and eastern Tanzania, Pemba Island)
Charaxes kirki daria Rothschild, 1903  (Ethiopia: east of the Rift Valley)
Charaxes kirki suk Carpenter & Jackson, 1950 (Uganda: central and north to the area west of Lake Rudolf)

References

External links
Images of C. kirki daria Royal Museum for Central Africa (Albertine Rift Project)
Images of C. kirki suk (Albertine Rift Project)
Charaxes kirki images at Consortium for the Barcode of Life
Charaxes kirki kirki images at BOLD
Charaxes kirki daria images at BOLD

Butterflies described in 1881
kirki
Butterflies of Africa
Taxa named by Arthur Gardiner Butler